Fargo is an American dark comedy–crime drama television series created and primarily written by Noah Hawley. The show is inspired by the 1996 film of the same name written and directed by the Coen brothers, who serve as executive producers on the series. It premiered on April 15, 2014, on FX.

 In February 2022, the series was renewed for a fifth season.

Series overview

Episodes

Season 1 (2014)

Season 2 (2015)

Season 3 (2017)

Season 4 (2020)

Ratings

References

External links
 
 

Fargo
Fargo